Owen Petersen (born November 29, 1942) is a Republican member of the Wyoming State House of Representatives for the 19th district, encompassing Uinta County.

Biography
Owen Petersen was born on November 19, 1942, in Lyman, Wyoming. He received a B.S. in 1965, an M.S. in 1967, and a J.D. in 1974, all from the University of Wyoming.

He is a retired military officer.

He has been a member of the Wyoming House of Representatives since 2001. In 2009, he sponsored HB 74, a bill that would have made marriage contracts from out-of-state valid in Wyoming so long as they involve one man and one woman.

He is a member of the National Rifle Association, the American Legion, the Lions Clubs International, Ducks Unlimited, and the AARP. He is a member of the Church of Jesus Christ of Latter-day Saints. He is married with three children and seven grandchildren.

References

1942 births
Living people
People from Lyman, Wyoming
Latter Day Saints from Wyoming
University of Wyoming alumni
Members of the Wyoming House of Representatives